Daniel Gerald O'Connor (October 15, 1894 - June 9, 1964) was a professional football player in the National Football League with the Canton Bulldogs in 1920 and the Cleveland Indians in 1921. Before joining the NFL, Dan split his college football career between Boston College and Georgetown. He was elected the captain of the Hoya football team in 1916.

Notes

1894 births
1964 deaths
Sportspeople from Manchester, New Hampshire
Players of American football from New Hampshire
American football offensive guards
American football offensive tackles
Boston College Eagles football players
Georgetown Hoyas football players
Canton Bulldogs players
Cleveland Indians (NFL) players